Cryptoblepharus buchananii, also known commonly as Buchanan's snake-eyed skink, is a species of lizard in the family Scincidae. The species is endemic to Western Australia.

Habitat
The preferred natural habitats of C. buchananii are desert, shrubland, and forest.

Description

Reproduction
C. buchananii is oviparous.

References

Further reading
Cogger HG (2014). Reptiles and Amphibians of Australia, Seventh Edition. Clayton, Victoria, Australia: CSIRO Publishing. xxx + 1,033 pp. .
Gray JE (1838). "Catalogue of the Slender-tongued Saurians, with Descriptions of many new Genera and Species". Annals and Magazine of Natural History, [First Series ] 2: 287–293. (Tiliqua buchananii, new species, p. 291).
Wilson, Steve; Swan, Gerry (2013). A Complete Guide to Reptiles of Australia, Fourth Edition. Sydney: New Holland Publishers. 522 pp. .

Cryptoblepharus
Skinks of Australia
Endemic fauna of Australia
Reptiles described in 1838
Taxa named by John Edward Gray